Aftab Alam (born 30 November 1992) is an Afghan international cricketer. He made his One Day International (ODI) debut for the Afghanistan national cricket team in early 2010. He made his first-class debut for Mis Ainak Region in the 2017–18 Ahmad Shah Abdali 4-day Tournament on 13 November 2017.

In July 2018, he was the leading wicket-taker for Speen Ghar Region in the 2018 Ghazi Amanullah Khan Regional One Day Tournament, with ten dismissals in four matches.

In September 2018, he was named in Balkh's squad in the first edition of the Afghanistan Premier League tournament.

In April 2019, he was named in Afghanistan's squad for the 2019 Cricket World Cup. However, Aftab was ruled out of the tournament due to "exceptional circumstances" and was replaced by Sayed Shirzad. After the tournament, the Afghanistan Cricket Board (ACB) handed Aftab a one-year ban from all cricket, following a series of incidents that took place during the Cricket World Cup. In June 2020, the ACB confirmed that his ban had ended and that he had joined the national team at a training camp.

References

External links
 

1992 births
Afghan cricketers
Afghanistan One Day International cricketers
Afghanistan Twenty20 International cricketers
Cricketers from Nangarhar Province
Asian Games medalists in cricket
Living people
Cricketers at the 2010 Asian Games
Cricketers at the 2015 Cricket World Cup
Cricketers at the 2019 Cricket World Cup
Mis Ainak Knights cricketers
Spin Ghar Tigers cricketers
Asian Games silver medalists for Afghanistan
Medalists at the 2010 Asian Games
Balkh Legends cricketers
Dambulla Aura cricketers